Casey J. FitzRandolph (born January 21, 1975) is an American speed skater.

In 1997, FitzRandolph won the bronze medal at the World Sprint Championships in Hamar. He won another bronze medal in 2001 at the World Single Distance Championships on the 500 m.

His best year so far was 2002. He won silver at the World Sprint Championships in Hamar and went on to become Olympic Champion on the 500 m at the 2002 Winter Olympics in Salt Lake City. This made him the first American to win the 500 m since fellow Madison native Eric Heiden won the event in 1980. Heiden was in attendance as the team orthopedist. He and his family now live in Cross Plains Wisconsin.

At the 2006 Winter Olympics in Turin, FitzRandolph finished 12th on the 500 m and 9th on the 1,000 m.

External links
 
 
 PB's and a link to International Results Casey FitzRandolph at Speedskatingbase.eu
 Casey FitzRandolph at Team USA
 
 
 
 
 

1975 births
Living people
American male speed skaters
Sportspeople from Madison, Wisconsin
Speed skaters at the 1998 Winter Olympics
Speed skaters at the 2002 Winter Olympics
Speed skaters at the 2006 Winter Olympics
Olympic gold medalists for the United States in speed skating
Medalists at the 2002 Winter Olympics
People from Verona, Wisconsin